Reno 1868 FC was an American professional soccer team based in Reno, Nevada. Founded in 2015, the team made its debut in the USL Championship in March 2017 and ceased operations after the 2020 season.

History 

Previously, northern Nevada has had three other professional minor league soccer teams: Reno Rattlers, Northern Nevada Aces, and Nevada Wonders.  Nevertheless, Reno now has a large youth soccer base and growing popularity of the sport. On September 16, 2015, USL announced that they would expand to Reno, Nevada starting in 2017. The club would be owned by Herbert Simon.

To generate interest and increased fan involvement with a successful acquisition of a team, the new "USL Reno 2017" team would be named through a contest. Over 5,300 entries were submitted during a lengthened initial contest portion, followed by fans choosing from amongst the top six names: Reno FC, FC Reno, Reno Silver FC, Reno City FC, Reno United, or Reno 1868. The fans response refined the contest down to three finalists—Reno FC, Reno United, and Reno 1868—with the winner being Reno 1868 Football Club, a nod to the founding year of the City of Reno.

On June 29, 2016, Reno 1868 announced a two-year partnership with the San Jose Earthquakes of MLS.  It was also stated that San Jose would have control over the technical side of the club. The team hired Earthquakes Assistant Coach Ian Russell as Head Coach on November 22, 2016. On February 10, 2018, San Jose and Reno announced an extension of their affiliate partnership deal through the end of the 2019 season, with an option for the 2020 season. The club won their first playoff match on October 20, 2018, in an away match at Real Monarchs.

On November 6, 2020, the club announced it was ceasing operations as a result of the financial and operational impacts of the COVID-19 pandemic.

Colors and crest 
The colors of Reno 1868 FC were Nevada cobalt blue, silver grey, and light gold, all colors featured on the flag of Nevada. "With all home matches played on green grass, all of the colors of the flag will be represented on matchdays in Reno." Similar to the naming of the club, the color choices were fan-driven.

Reno 1868's crest was released on May 25, 2016, with the first kit being released on June 11, 2016.  SpineNevada, a local spine care facility, was the kit sponsor for the first two years before Reno Orthopedic Clinic ("ROC") took over sponsorship in 2019.

Kit suppliers and sponsors

Stadium 

Reno 1868 FC played its home matches at Greater Nevada Field in Reno, Nevada, also home to the Reno Aces of the Pacific Coast League. Greater Nevada Field (formerly known as Aces Ballpark) is a 9,013-seat natural grass stadium.

Team records

Year-by-year

1. Top Scorer includes statistics from league matches only.

Head coaches
 Includes USL Regular season, USL Play-offs and Lamar Hunt U.S. Open Cup

Average attendance

References

External links
 Reno 1868 FC at United Soccer League

 
Association football clubs established in 2015
USL Championship teams
Soccer clubs in Nevada
2015 establishments in Nevada
2020 disestablishments in Nevada
Association football clubs disestablished in 2020